Aethalopteryx tristis is a moth in the family Cossidae. It is found in Namibia, Kenya and South Africa.

References

Moths described in 1915
Aethalopteryx
Moths of Africa
Insects of Namibia
Fauna of Somalia